Amelio A. Della Chiesa (1901-1975) was an American politician who served as mayor of Quincy, Massachusetts.

Early life
Della Chiesa was born on July 31, 1901 in Quincy, Massachusetts. He attended public schools in Quincy, Massachusetts, including the Quincy Trade School, but dropped out in eighth grade. At the age of sixteen he became a journeyman plumber at 17 he became the youngest master plumber in Massachusetts.

Political career
Della Chiesa began his political career in 1943 when he succeeded his brother, Aldo (who had entered the military), on the Quincy City Council. From 1954 to 1957, Della Chiesa served as Quincy's mayor under the Plan E form of government, in which the position of Mayor was a ceremonial one appointed by the city council while the government was run by a city manager. When the city switched to a Plan A form of government, he was elected to position, which he held until his retirement in 1965. During his tenure as mayor, Quincy Vocational Technical School was constructed and additions were built at Quincy City Hospital, North Quincy Branch Library, and the Atlantic Fire Station.

From 1953 to 1969, Della Chiesa also served as a member of the Massachusetts House of Representatives from the 1st Norfolk district. He served as assistant minority floor leader and monitor of the House.

From 1964 to 1965, Della Chiesa was the vice chairman of the Massachusetts Bay Transportation Authority advisory board.

In retirement, he and his wife moved to Pembroke, Massachusetts.

Death
Della Chiesa died on October 1, 1975 following a long illness.

See also
 1953–1954 Massachusetts legislature
 1955–1956 Massachusetts legislature

References

1901 births
1975 deaths
American plumbers
Mayors of Quincy, Massachusetts
Republican Party members of the Massachusetts House of Representatives
20th-century American politicians